Everyday Process is a Christian hip hop duo from Chester, Pennsylvania. The members are Iz-Real and Mac the Doulos. In 2007, Cross Movement Records released the duo's first album Everyday Process: The Process of Illumination & Elimination. This charted on two Billboard charts. The second and last album from the duo in 2009 was Outtadisworld, with Cross Movement Records.

Early life
Everyday Process are two Christian hip hop artists, who come together to create a duo, from Chester, Pennsylvania. They are Iz-Real and Mac the Doulos.

Music career
Everyday Process started making music in 2007. They became signed to Cross Movement Records before their 2007 release, Everyday Process: The Process of Illumination & Elimination, This album charted on two Billboard charts. Their next, 2009's Outtadisworld, with the same record label, just charted on one Billboard chart.

Discography

Studio albums

References

Musical groups established in 1997
Christian hip hop groups
Musical groups from Pennsylvania
American musical duos
Hip hop duos
American hip hop groups